Giovanni Battista Bracelli may refer to:

 Giovanni Battista Bracelli (bishop) (d. 1590), an Italian bishop;
 Giovanni Battista Braccelli (fl. 1616–1649), the name of one or more Italian painters.